Nicola or Niccolo Massaro (died 1704) was an Italian painter of the late-Baroque period, active in his native city of Naples. He painted mainly marine vedute and landscapes in the style of his master, Salvatore Rosa. One of his colleagues was Marzio Masturzo. One of his pupils was Gaetano Martoriello, and Massaro's son's Girolamo and Gennaro.

References

1704 deaths
17th-century Italian painters
Italian male painters
18th-century Italian painters
Italian landscape painters
Painters from Naples
Italian Baroque painters
Year of birth uncertain
18th-century Italian male artists